Neal Creighton Sr. (July 11, 1930 - September 15, 2020) was a retired major general of the United States Army who led the 3rd Squadron, 11th Armored Cavalry Regiment during the 1968 Tet Offensive in the Vietnam War. Creighton was also the CEO and president of The Robert R. McCormick Tribune Foundation from 1986 to 1999.

References

1930 births
2020 deaths
United States Army personnel of the Vietnam War
Recipients of the Defense Distinguished Service Medal
Recipients of the Distinguished Service Medal (US Army)
Recipients of the Legion of Merit
Recipients of the Silver Star
United States Army generals
People from Comanche County, Oklahoma